Gasper may refer to:

Places
 Gasper, Kentucky, U.S.
 Gasper River, a river in southwestern Kentucky, U.S.
 Gasper Township, Ohio, U.S.
 Gasper, Wiltshire, England, UK

People
 Gasper (name)
 Gasper (Gondophares), Indo-Parthian king, traditionally identified as one of the three Biblical Magi who attended the birth of Christ
 Gasper, one who gasps
 Gasper, a participant in erotic asphyxiation

Other uses
 Gasper, a marijuana cigarette
 Gasper, British slang for a type of high tar cigarette, such as:
 Woodbine (cigarette)
 Gauloises
 Gasper (aircraft), a type of adjustable ventilation outlet used in aircraft
 Gasper goo, or freshwater drum, a species of fish

See also

 
 Casper (disambiguation)
 Gaspar (disambiguation)
 Gasp (disambiguation)